Joanne Rowling, known by her pen name J. K. Rowling, is a British author and philanthropist. She has won numerous accolades for her Harry Potter book series, including general literature prizes, honours in children's literature and speculative fiction awards. The series has garnered multiple British Book Awards, beginning with the Children's Book of the Year in 1997 and 1998 for the first two volumes, Harry Potter and the Philosopher's Stone and Harry Potter and the Chamber of Secrets. In 2000 the third novel, Harry Potter and the Prisoner of Azkaban, was nominated for an adult award – the Whitbread Book of the Year – where it competed against a book by a Nobel prize laureate (Seamus Heaney's translation of Beowulf. The award body gave Rowling the children's prize instead (worth half the cash amount); some scholars view this as exposing a literary prejudice against children's books. Next followed the World Science Fiction Convention's 2001 Hugo Award for the fourth book, Harry Potter and the Goblet of Fire, and the British Book Awards' adult prize – the 2006 Book of the Year – for the sixth novel, Harry Potter and the Half-Blood Prince.

Rowling's early career awards include the Order of the British Empire (OBE) for services to children's literature in 2000, and three years later, the Spanish Prince of Asturias Award for Concord. She won the  British Book Awards' Author of the Year and Outstanding Achievement prizes over the span of the Harry Potter series. Following the series' completion, Time named Rowling a runner-up for its 2007 Person of the Year, citing the social, moral and political inspiration she gave the Harry Potter fandom. Two years later, she was recognised as a Chevalier de la Légion d'Honneur  by French President Nicolas Sarkozy; leading magazine editors then named her the "Most Influential Woman in the UK" the following October. Later awards include the Freedom of the City of London in 2012 and for her services to literature and philanthropy, the Order of the Companions of Honour (CH) in 2017.

Academic bodies have bestowed multiple honours on Rowling. She has received honorary degrees from the University of Aberdeen; the University of St Andrews; Dartmouth College; the University of Edinburgh; Edinburgh Napier University; the University of Exeter (which she attended) and Harvard University. Rowling spoke at Harvard's 2008 commencement ceremony; the same year, she also won University College Dublin's James Joyce Award. Her other honours include fellowship of the Royal Society of Literature (FRSL), the Royal Society of Edinburgh (HonFRSE) and the Royal College of Physicians of Edinburgh (FRCPE).

Rowling's awards for film, theatre and crime fiction include the 2011 British Academy Film Award for Outstanding British Contribution to Cinema for the Harry Potter film series, the 2017 Laurence Olivier Award for Best New Play for Harry Potter and the Cursed Child, and the 2021 British Book Awards' Crime and Thriller category for the fifth volume of her Cormoran Strike series.

Literature

General literature

Speculative fiction

Crime fiction

Film and theatre

Career awards

State

Academic

Popular culture

Miscellaneous

Notes

References

Sources

 
 
 
 
 
 

Awards
Rowling